Les Breuleux-Eglise railway station is a railway station in the municipality of Les Breuleux, in the Swiss canton of Jura. It is located on the  Tavannes–Noirmont railway line of Chemins de fer du Jura. It is one of the two stations in the municipality: the other, is  further down the line.

Services 
 the following services stop at Les Breuleux-Eglise:

References

External links 
 
 

Railway stations in the canton of Jura
Chemins de fer du Jura stations